USA-151, also known as GPS IIR-5, GPS SVN-44, and Navstar-48 is an American navigation satellite which forms part of the Global Positioning System. It was the fifth Block IIR GPS satellite to be launched, out of thirteen in the original configuration, and twenty one overall. It was built by Lockheed Martin, using the AS-4000 satellite bus.

USA-151 was launched at 09:17:00 UTC on 16 July 2000, atop a Delta II carrier rocket, flight number D279, flying in the 7925-9.5 configuration. The launch took place from Space Launch Complex 17A at the Cape Canaveral Air Force Station, and placed USA-151 into a transfer orbit. The satellite raised itself into medium Earth orbit using a Star-37FM apogee motor.

It is used to broadcast the PRN 28 signal, and operates in slot 3 of plane B of the GPS constellation, having originally been operated in slot 5. It was retired on 23 June 2021.

References

Spacecraft launched in 2000
GPS satellites
USA satellites